Neoeromene octavianella is a moth in the family Crambidae. It was described by Philipp Christoph Zeller in 1877. It is found in Panama.

References

Diptychophorini
Moths described in 1877